Believers  is the third album by folk artist A.A. Bondy, released September 13, 2011, on Fat Possum Records. The album was recorded at Mant/Kingsize Studios in Glassell Park, Los Angeles in the spring of 2011 and produced by Rob Schnapf.

Critical response
Spin gave Believers a score of 8/10, calling it an album of "deceptively austere alt folk...ludicrously gorgeous, vaporous, and reverb-caressed, like the hushed, almost unbearable intimacy of pre-fame Cat Power."

Track listing

Personnel
A.A. Bondy - guitar, vocals
Ben Lester - drums, piano, pedal steel
Macey Taylor - bass

References

2011 albums
A. A. Bondy albums